MS Polaris was a Russian-owned, Danish-built passenger ship in service with the Murmansk Shipping Company and based in Murmansk. It was built in 1968, and until 2000, it served as a ferry between cities in Greenland, mainly passenger transfers along the Greenland coastline. In 2000 the was bought by Scandinavian Cruise Line and was refurbished in Denmark by Master Mariner AB, Sweden. She was named M/S Shearwaterto and changed to Bahamian flag. She was sold to Norway 2001. It moved to Russia in 2005

It holds 80 passengers and is equipped with a lounge with bar, as well as a library, covered deck, outside deck and a gift shop. It was renovated at Tallinn, Estonia in 2005 and offered cruises in the Barents Sea and transfers from Murmansk to St. Petersburg, Archangelsk, the Solovets Islands and was also the only ship that stops at Vaygach Island.

It was surveyed in Murmansk on 27 February 2010 and found to be in good condition.

References

External links
Det Norske Veritas
Russian Maritime Register
Great Canadian Travel Company
MS Polaris

1968 ships
Passenger ships of Russia